Adrien Tambay (born 25 February 1991) is a French professional racing driver. He currently is an official CUPRA driver and is the 2022 ETCR Champion. He is the son of former Formula One driver Patrick Tambay, who won two Grands Prix for Ferrari in the early 1980s.

Career

Formula BMW
Born in Paris, Tambay began his car racing career in the German Formula BMW ADAC series, finishing fourth and rookie champion. He moved to the new Formula BMW Europe series in 2008, where he finished third behind Esteban Gutiérrez and Marco Wittmann.

Formula Three
In 2009 he raced in the Formula Three Euroseries for leading team ART Grand Prix. He missed the Oschersleben and Nürburgring rounds of the Euroseries, and also an invitational entry to the British Formula 3 Championship at Spa, due to a head injury suffered playing football. He ended the Euroseries season pointless, recording a best finish of seventh at EuroSpeedway and the Norisring.

Auto GP
In 2010 he raced in the Auto GP series for Charouz-Gravity Racing.

GP3
After James Jakes had a wrist injury at Hockenheim, Tambay was called in to replace him in Manor Racing. In his second outing at Spa-Francorchamps, Tambay retired first race and therefore started 27th in the second race. The rain started during the race, but Tambay kept driving on slicks, and winning the race ahead of Alexander Rossi.

DTM

Adrien Tambay was one of the eight Audi factory drivers in the DTM championship for five years between 2012 and 2016. He scored a top ten championship finish in his first year and amassed a total of 3 podiums, 1 pole position and 1 fastest lap throughout his DTM career.

Racing record

Complete Formula 3 Euro Series results
(key) (Races in bold indicate pole position; races in italics indicate fastest lap)

† Driver did not finish the race, but was classified as he completed over 90% of the race distance.

Complete Auto GP Results

(key) (Races in bold indicate pole position) (Races in italics indicate fastest lap)

Complete GP3 Series results
(key) (Races in bold indicate pole position) (Races in italics indicate fastest lap)

Complete Formula Renault 3.5 Series results
(key)

Complete Deutsche Tourenwagen Masters results
(key) (Races in bold indicate pole position) (Races in italics indicate fastest lap)

† Driver did not finish, but completed 75% of the race distance.

Complete European Le Mans Series results
(key) (Races in bold indicate pole position; results in italics indicate fastest lap)

Complete 24 Hours of Le Mans results

References

External links

 

1991 births
Living people
Racing drivers from Paris
French racing drivers
Formula BMW ADAC drivers
Formula BMW Europe drivers
Formula 3 Euro Series drivers
British Formula Three Championship drivers
Auto GP drivers
French GP3 Series drivers
Intercontinental Rally Challenge drivers
World Series Formula V8 3.5 drivers
Deutsche Tourenwagen Masters drivers
Blancpain Endurance Series drivers
24 Hours of Le Mans drivers
Manor Motorsport drivers
ART Grand Prix drivers
EuroInternational drivers
Charouz Racing System drivers
DAMS drivers
Campos Racing drivers
Pons Racing drivers
Draco Racing drivers
Abt Sportsline drivers
Audi Sport drivers
European Le Mans Series drivers
Eifelland Racing drivers
Mercedes-AMG Motorsport drivers
Strakka Racing drivers
Josef Kaufmann Racing drivers
Team Rosberg drivers
W Racing Team drivers
Saintéloc Racing drivers
Cupra Racing drivers
GT4 European Series drivers